BBC Romanian was the Romanian branch of the BBC World Service (Radio) for Romania and Moldova. Since 2004, it broadcast on its own frequency (only in Bucharest - 88 FM, Chişinău - 97,2 FM, Timișoara - 93,9 FM and Constanţa - 96,9 FM); until then its signal was re-broadcast by local radio stations, partners of BBC Romanian.

On 25 June 2008, the BBC announced that it would close its Romanian language service after 69 years of broadcasting, effective 1 August 2008.

See also
BBC Radio
BBC World Service

References

External links
BBC Romanian in Moldova
BBC Romanian in Romania

Romanian
Romanian-language radio stations
Romania–United Kingdom relations
2008 disestablishments in the United Kingdom
Moldova–United Kingdom relations

Radio stations established in 1939
1939 establishments in the United Kingdom